This is a list of yearly Great American Conference football standings. The Great American Conference is a National Collegiate Athletic Association Division II conference for American football.

Great American standings

References

Standings
Great American Conference